Henan Elephants is a team of the Chinese Baseball League which started to participate the league in the 2010 season.                                                                                                      

Baseball in China
Sport in Beijing